Jakub Martinec is professor of choral activities at Memorial University of Newfoundland, holds a Ph.D. in music from the University of Western Ontario and Artistic Advisor, former Conductor and Founding Artistic Director of the Czech Boys Choir.

Biography
His research focuses on a comparison of European and North American perspectives of choral conducting as well as investigations of early Czech choral literature, and pedagogical strategies for teaching adolescent male singers. Born in the Czech Republic, he was the founding artistic director of the renowned Czech Boys Choir.

Dr. Martinec has recorded for national TV and Radio in the Czech Republic; and he has directed on numerous CD's and DVD's, of which his recording of Britten's A Ceremony of Carols received a Recording of the Month award by the London-based Classical Music Web. Dr. Martinec has performed with eminent orchestras, ensembles and musical personalities in some of the world's most famous concert halls and cathedrals, including Meistersingerhalle, Nürnberg, Germany (2005, 2009, 2011), Grace Cathedral in San Francisco, USA (2004), Winspear Hall in Edmonton, Canada (2006), Massey Hall in Toronto, Canada (2012), the Pantheon and the Basilica Santa Maria Maggiore in Rome for the leaders of the Vatican (2009, 2010), Truro Cathedral, UK (2013) and regularly at the Rudolfinum Dvorak Hall and Smetana Hall in Prague.

With his choirs, he performed the opening concert of choral cycle of the Czech Philharmonic Orchestra (2006), and has appeared at numerous international music festivals including The Prague Spring Festival (2004, 2005), AmericaFest International Festival for Boys’ & Men’ Choirs including the VIth World Choral Symposium in Minneapolis (2002), Festival d'Ambronay (2006), Mitte Europa (2008, 2009, 2013), and the highly acclaimed World Festival of Singing for Men and Boys (Prague, Hradec Kralove, 2004, 2008).

In 2020, Martinec was one of the recipients of the Top 25 Canadian Immigrant Awards of 2020.

References

1979 births
Czech choral conductors
Czech classical musicians
Czech music educators
Living people
Academic staff of the Memorial University of Newfoundland
Musicians from Hradec Králové
University of Western Ontario alumni
21st-century conductors (music)